Kuchenne rewolucje (pol. Kitchen revolutions) is a Polish reality television series broadcast on the TVN, in which Chef Magda Gessler is invited by the owners to spend 4 days with a failing restaurant in an attempt to revive the business. It is the Polish version of British Ramsay's Kitchen Nightmares.

Ratings

Episodes

Season 1: Spring 2010 - Saturday 6 p.m.

 Renamed Tawerna Kapetanias (eng. Tavern Kapetanias) during production 
 Renamed Alpejska Polana (eng. Alpine Glade) during production

Season 2: Autumn 2010 - Saturday 6 p.m.

Season 3: Spring 2011 - Saturday 6 p.m.

 Renamed Pod Prosiakiem (eng. At the Piglets) during production 
 Renamed U Samuela (eng. At Samuel) during production
 Renamed Edelweiss during production
 Renamed Róża (eng. Pink) during production
 Renamed Zielone Drzewo (eng. Green Tree) during production

Season 4: Autumn 2011 - Thursday 9.30 p.m. 

 Renamed Ale Bajka (eng. What A Tale) during production
 Renamed Wiszące Ogrody nad Narwią (eng. Pendant Gardens over Narwią) during production
 Renamed Don Kichot during production
 Renamed Metka (eng. Meat Spreag) during production
 The restaurant Stella Cafe in 11 episode was closed before the final dinner because of the owner's debt. The bailiff closed the restaurant. Magda Gessler could not carry out the revolution for the first time in the history of the program. The restaurant would have been renamed "Springer"

Season 5: Spring 2012 - Thursday 9.30 p.m.

 Renamed Kapitan Kuk (eng. Captain Kuk) during production
 Renamed Kiełbacha i Korale (eng. Sausage and Corals) during production
 Renamed Bar Familijny (eng. Family bar) during production
 Renamed Pyszny Browar (eng. Delicious Brewery) during production
 Renamed Labolatorium Pizzy (eng. Vaboratory of Pizza) during production
 Renamed Pod Jeleniem (eng. Under At Deer) during production
 Renamed Śniadaniarnia (eng. Breakfast home) during production
 Renamed Farma Wawrzyńca (eng. Lawrence's Farm) during production

Season 6: Autumn 2012 - Thursday 9.30 p.m.

 Renamed Obora (eng. Cowshed) during production
 Renamed Ąka during production
 Renamed Dziki Dwór Pod Kaczką (eng. Wild Manor At Duck) during production 
 Renamed Trattoria da Tadeusz during production
 Renamed Willa pod złotym ziemniakiem (eng. Villa under the Golden Potato) during production

- The LeoLibra (episode 6, season 6) According to Magda Gessler, the worst restaurant before 9 episode, the 7th season.  But in spite of this revolution ended a great success

Season 7: Spring 2013 - Thursday 9.30 p.m.

 Renamed Schabowy... Raz! (eng. Chop ... Once !) during production
Renamed Golonka w Pepitkę (eng. Knuckle in Dogtooth Check) during production
Renamed American House during production
Renamed U Schabińskiej (eng. In Schabińskia) during production
Renamed U sióstr (eng. In Sisters) during production
 Renamed Viva Grecja (eng. Viva Greece) during production 
Renamed Szprota (eng. Sprat) during production

- Perła (episode 9, season 7) According to Magda Gessler, the worst restaurant before 14 episode, 8th of the season.  But in spite of this revolution ended a great success

Season 8: Autumn 2013 - Thursday 9.30 p.m.

Renamed Pod Jabłonką (eng. Under the Apple Tree) during production
Renamed Kurnik (eng. Henhouse) during production
Renamed Lwów (eng. Lviv) during production
Renamed Absynt during production
Renamed Bar Zigi during production
Renamed Gorąca Kiełbasiarnia (eng. Hot Sausage House) during production
Renamed Beka during production
Renamed Modra Pyza (eng. Deep-blue Kind of noodles) during production
Renamed Dom Bawarski (eng. Bavarian House) during production
 Renamed Ararat during production 
Renamed Marilyn during production

- Tavern (episode 14, season 8) According to Magda Gessler, the worst restaurant before 3rd episode, 10th of the season.  But in spite of this revolution ended a great success

Season 9: Spring 2014 - Thursday 9.30 p.m.

Renamed Pad Thai during production
Renamed Ciao Ciao! during production
Renamed Bufet rulandia (eng. Buffet Rulandia) during production
Renamed Casa di Fulvio Maria Viola during production
Renamed Madame during production
Renamed Bistro Bochenek (eng. Bistro Loaf) during production
Renamed Chleb & Sól (eng. Bread & Salt) during production
Renamed Bistro Jajo (eng. Egg Bistro) during production
Renamed Mee...lina Bar during production
Renamed Steak & Lobster during production

Season 10: Autumn 2014 - Thursday 9.30 p.m.

Renamed Mio Angeli during production
Renamed Przystanek Łosoś (eng STOP Salmon) during production
Renamed Pod cielakiem (eng. At the Calve) during production
Renamed Gęsie Sprawki (eng. Goose Doings) during production 
Renamed Francja  Elegancja (eng. France Elegance) during production 
Renamed Pyza Śląska (eng. Kind of noodles Silesia) during production 
Renamed Pierożkarnia (eng. Dumpling) during production 
Renamed Długi Wąż (eng. Long Snake) during production

- Millennium (episode 3, season 10) According to Magda Gessler, so far the worst restaurant in the history of Kitchen Revolution.  But in spite of this revolution ended a great success.

Season 11: Spring 2015 - Thursday 9.30 p.m.

Renamed Casa de Locos during production 
Renamed Lemon Capri during production 
Renamed Sielawka during production 
Renamed Bar Urlop (eng. Bar Leave) during production 
Renamed Świnka i Rybka (eng. Mumps and Fish) during production 
Renamed Hej Sokoły (eng. Hey Falcons) during production 
Renamed Duchówka during production

Season 12: Autumn 2015 - Thursday 8.50 p.m.

Renamed Bistro Bzik (eng. Bistro Craze) during production
Renamed Charlie’s Star during production
Renamed Owce i Róże (eng. Sheep and Pinks) during production
Renamed La Bambola during production
Renamed Krochmal (eng. Starch) during production
Renamed Sowa Nasza Kasza (eng. Owl Our Groats) during production
Renamed Wypas during production
Renamed Chrup Chrup Kartofel (eng. Crunch Crunch Spud) during production
Renamed Batory during production
Renamed Dzika Świnia (eng. Wild Pig) during production
Renamed Zajezdnia (eng. Shed) during production
Renamed Kolorowe Gary (eng. Colourful Pots) during production

Season 13: Spring 2016 - Thursday 9.30 p.m.

Renamed Phúc Phúc during production

Season 14: Autumn 2016 - Thursday 9.30 p.m.

Season 15: Spring 2017 - Thursday 9.30 p.m.

Renamed Francuska Bajadera (eng. French Bayadeer) during production
Renamed La Casa Del Polacco during production
Renamed Biała Choina (eng. White Pine) during production
Renamed Wałkowane (eng. Rolled Out) during production
Renamed Restauracja Miedziana (eng. Copper Restaurant) during production
Renamed La Nonna Siciliana during production
Renamed Dom Restauracja Sztum (eng. House Restaurant Sztum) during production
Renamed Karpiówka during production
Renamed Gęsia Nóżka (eng. Goose Leg) during production
Renamed Gar Na Gazie (eng. Pot On Gas) during production
Renamed Gospoda Jagoda (eng. Berry Inn) during production
Renamed Piknik w Kratkę (eng. Picnic in Check) during production
Renamed Gong Ji during production

Season 16: Autumn 2017 - Thursday 9.30 p.m.

Renamed Il Pino during production
Renamed Restauracja Modra (eng. Deep-blue Restaurant) during production
Renamed Utarte during production
Renamed Stara Łaźnia (eng. Old Bath) during production
Renamed Nie Lada Ryba (eng. Not Counter Fish) during production
Renamed Cibo Pazzesco during production
Renamed Der Schwarze Schmetterling (eng. Black Butterfly) during production
Renamed Kartofel Buda (eng. Potato Shed) during production
Renamed ser-o!-mania during production
Renamed Latający Johan (eng. Flying Johan) during production
Renamed Ziemia Barańsk (eng. Earth Barańsk) during production
Renamed Bistro Sztufada during production
Renamed Szynk w Pszowie (eng. Inn in Pszowie) during production

- Le Papillon Noir (episode 7, season 16) According to Magda Gessler, so far the worst restaurant in the history of Kitchen Revolution. But in spite of this revolution ended a great success.

Season 17: Spring 2018 - Thursday 9.30 p.m.

Renamed Śledź i chleb (eng. Herring and bread) during production
Renamed Kiełbasa i sznurek (eng. Sausage and string) during production
Renamed Bistro Siekane (eng. Chopped Bistro) during production
Renamed Kotlet Bistro (eng. Cutlet Bistro) during production
Renamed Zajazd Babski (eng. Womanish Inn) during production
Renamed Bistro By the Way during production
Renamed Po prostu stołówka (eng. Just a canteen) during production
Renamed Gospoda Kaczki za wodą (eng. Duck's farm behind the water) during production
Renamed Trattoria Bandiera Italiana during production
Renamed Zaczarowany sad (eng. Enchanted orchard) during production
Renamed Ryba z Ikrą (eng. Fish with Ikra) during production
Renamed Jeż i jesz (eng. Hedgehog and eat) during production
Renamed Bistro Plaaaacek Chrupiący during production

Season 18: Autumn 2018 - Thursday 9.30 p.m.

Renamed Gospoda Kwaśnica (eng. Barberry Inn) during production
Renamed Oberża Bażant (eng. Pheasant Inn) during production
Renamed Gospoda z górki (eng. Downhill Inn) during production
Renamed Biały Bawół (eng. White Buffalo) during production
Renamed Hot Burger Bistro during production
Renamed Bielany Bielany during production
Renamed Bistro Kalamata during production
Renamed Pieczone Gołąbki (eng. Baked cabbage rolls) during production
Renamed Soczyste Pieczyste Bistro (eng. Juicy Roast Bistro) during production
Renamed Żar Tandoori (eng. Tandoori's heat) during production
Renamed Malinowa spiżarnia (eng. Raspberry pantry) during production

Season 19: Spring 2019 - Thursday 9.30 p.m.

Renamed Karczma Żółtodzioby (eng. Yellow-billed Inn) during production
Renamed A Morze Las (eng. A Sea Forest) during production
Renamed Szynk u Fojermana (eng. Fojerman's ham) during production
Renamed Bistro Granat (eng. Bistro Grenade) during production
Renamed Karczma Kurak z Pieca (eng. Chicken from the oven Inn) during production
Renamed Pyszny Zajazd (eng. Delicious Inn) during production
Renamed Oberża dawno, dawno temu... (eng. A long time ago... Inn) during production
Renamed Kociewskie Jadło (eng. Kociewskie Food) during production
Renamed Viva Ibiza during production
Renamed Bistro Gniecione (eng. Bistro Crumpled) during production
Renamed Pomidorowe Bistro (eng. Tomato Bistro) during production
Renamed Cuba Banana during production
Renamed Złote jajo (eng. Golden egg) during production

Season 20: Autumn 2019 - Thursday 9.30 p.m.

Renamed Chłop i baba (eng. Peasant and woman) during production
Renamed Gęś Pocztowa (eng. Postal Goose) during production
Renamed Niezapominajka (eng. Forget-me-not) during production
Renamed Barszcz (eng. Borsch) during production
Renamed Bistro Pyszne Korzenie (eng. Delicious Roots Bistro) during production
Renamed Mammy food during production
Renamed Pod rumianym jabłkiem (eng. Under a ruddy apple) during production
Renamed Kantyna. Do stołu marsz! (eng. Canteen. March to the table!) during production
Renamed Bistro w Kapuście (eng. Bistro in cabbage) during production
Renamed Nepal Bowl during production
Renamed Bistro prosto z targu (eng. Bistro straight from the market) during production
Renamed Osteria di Bitondo during production
Renamed Bławatek (eng. Bluebottle) during production

Season 21: Spring/Autumn 2020 - Thursday 9.30 p.m.

Renamed Bistro Schadzka przy Piecu (eng. Bistro Tryst by The Stove) during production
Renamed Oberża Dzik i Dąb (eng. Boar and Oak Inn) during production
Renamed Przyjemnie Podjadaj (eng. Enjoy Snacking) during production
Renamed Karczma Lis i Kura (eng. Fox and Hem Inn) during production
Renamed Karczochy u Marii (eng. Artichokes at Maria's) during production
Renamed Podaj Kaczkę Raz (eng. Pass the Duck Once) during production
Renamed Pizzeria di Bufala during production
Renamed Bistro Fiołek (eng. Bistro Violet) during production
Renamed Fest Bar during production
Renamed Zdolne łapy (eng. Capable hands) during production
Renamed Szynka na bogato (eng. Rich ham) during production
Renamed Gospoda chałupka (eng. Cottage Inn) during production
Renamed Tłusty Indyk (eng. Fat turkey) during production
Renamed Chimichuri American House during production
Renamed Restauracja W Gnieźnie (eng. Restaurant in Gniezno) during production
Renamed Kaczka na wodzie (eng. Duck on the water) during production
Renamed W małym domku (eng. In a small house) during production

Season 22: Spring 2021 - Thursday 9.30 p.m.

Renamed Dzik Dzik Dzik (eng. Boar Boar Boar) during production
Renamed Imber (eng. Ginger) during production
Renamed Trattoria Verde during production
Renamed Złoty Piknik (Eng. Golden Picnic) (eng. Bistro Violet) during production
Renamed Kolorowe Patelnie (eng. Colours Pans) during production
Renamed Ristorante Caponata Siciliana during production
Renamed Karczma Żurawinowa Chatka Zagadka (eng. Inn Cranberry Cottage Enigma) during production
Renamed Pizzeria Croccante during production
Renamed Doprawione jabłkiem (eng. Seasoned with apple) during production
Renamed 4 smaki na języku (eng. 4 flavors on the plate and tongue) during production
Renamed Bistro Śliwa (eng. The Plum Bistro) during production
Renamed List z Kaukazu (eng. A letter from the Caucasus) during production
Renamed Bistro "Niezłe kino" (eng. Nice Cinema Bistro) during production
Renamed Kluska Kluskę Pogania (eng. Dumpling A pagan dumpling) during production
Renamed Śląskie Niebo (eng. Silesian Heaven) during production

Season 23: Autumn 2021 - Thursday 9:30 p.m. 

Renamed Laboratorium Chleba (eng. Bread Laboratory) during production
Renamed Zajazd "Zielone Rykowisko (eng. The Green Rut Inn) during production
Renamed Bar Bigosu Czar (eng. Stew Bar Charm) during production
Renamed Szynk pod Cycokiem (eng. Ham under the Cycok) during production
Renamed Bistro "Prosto Od Serca" (eng. Straight of the Heart Bistro) during production
Renamed Kulinarna Fabryka Smaku (eng. Culinary Factory of Taste) during production
Renamed Karczma "Gę, gę, gę (eng. The Goose, Goose, Goose Inn) during production
Renamed Bistro "Ziemniak czy Kartofel" (eng. Potato or Potato? Bistro) during production
Renamed Bistro "Tajemniczy Staw" (eng. Mystery Pond Bistro) during production
Renamed Bistro "Pod Papryką" (eng. Under the Paprika Bistro) during production
Renamed Pełen Rondel (eng. A full saucepan) during production
Renamed Bar Viola (eng. Viola Bar) during production
Renamed Dobrze na Okrągło (eng. Well round) during production
Renamed Zajazd "Grasz w zielone?" (Do you play green Inn?) during production
-The chef Marzenna Koniuszy (this is episode 12 Milk Bar "Agata" Gorzów Wielkopolski) is died in 20th september 2021.

Season 24: Spring 2022 - Thursday 9:35 pm 

Renamed Restauracja "Piwem Podlane" (eng. "Beer watered" Restaurant) during production
Renamed Restauracja Gruzińska "Ghvino i śpiew" (eng. Georgian Restaurant "Ghvino and Singing") during production
Renamed Bistro "Entliczek-Pentliczek, czeski knedliczek" (eng. Bistro "Entliczek - Pentliczek, Czech dumplings") during production
Renamed "Rumiane" Bistro during production
Renamed Bistro "Z gęsią po drodze" (eng. Bistro "With a goose on the way") during production
Renamed Bistro "Idziemy w Góry" (eng. Bistro "We're going to the Mountains") during production
Renamed Bar "Pan Wurst" (eng. "Mr. Wurst" Bar) during production
Renamed Bistro Wietnamskie "Zielony Wietnam" (eng. Vietnamese Bistro "Green Vietnam") during production
Renamed Gospoda "Wino i Żarełko u Bujaka" (eng. "Wine and dairy at Bujak's" Inn) during production
Renamed Bistro "Prosta Kuchnia" (eng. Bistro "Simple Kitchen") during production
Renamed "Queens" Street Bar during production
Renamed Bistro "Chrupiąca Kalarepa" (eng. Bistro "Crispy Kohlrabi") during production

Season 25: Autumn 2022 - Thursday 9:35 pm 

Renamed Trattoria "Tavola Calda Siciliana" during production
Renamed Bistro "To tu i To tam" (eng. Bistro "It's here and It's there") during production
Renamed Knajpka "Czuszka" during production
Renamed Bistro Żydowskie "Pełno w Sieci" (eng. Jewish Bistro "Full on the Web") during production
Renamed Zajazd "Do Gruzji 2700km" (eng. Inn "To Georgia 2700km") during production
Renamed Restauracja "Złota Świnka" (eng. Restaurant "Golden Pig") during production
Renamed Bistro "Kaczki i Buraczki" (eng. Bistro "Ducks and Beets") during production
Renamed Bistro "Mam apetyt na..." (eng. Bistro "I have an appetite for ..." ) during production
Renamed Bistro "Brylancik" during production
Renamed Bar "Pomidor Cud - Malina" (eng. "Tomato Miracle - Raspberry" Bar) during production
Renamed Restauracja "Koronkowa robota" (eng. "Lace Work" Restaurant) during production
Renamed Bistro "U rodziny Gębalskich" (eng. "At the family of Gębalski" Bistro) during production
Renamed Trattoria "Angelino Pasta Wino" (eng. "Angel Pasta Wine" Trattoria) during production
Renamed Bar "Sztuka na Raz" (eng. "Art of meat at once" Bar) during production

Season 26: Spring 2023 - Thursday 9:35 pm 

Renamed Bistro francuskie "Voila Avignon" (eng. "Voila Avignon" French Bistro) during production
Renamed Bistro "Kolorowe Wazy" (eng. "Colorful Vases" Bistro) during production
Renamed Restauracja "Latające Smaki" (eng. "Flying Flavors" Restaurant) during production

Kitchen Returns

Season 2: Autumn 2015 - Thursday 9:50 p.m.

Season 3: Autumn 2017 - Thursday 10:30 p.m.

Season 4: Autumn 2022 - Saturday 7:30 p.m.

References

External links
 

2010 Polish television series debuts
Food reality television series
TVN (Polish TV channel) original programming